Marco Cianfanelli (born 30 November 1970) is a South African artist who has been involved in a wide range of projects involving art, architecture and public spaces. Cianfanelli combines computer-generated, data-driven applications with human, expressive, gestural acts to create tension in his work.  Cianfanelli is one of a handful of South African artists whose work successfully spans the public and domestic sphere. He began his career painting landscapes and continues to be concerned with romanticized space and that which is marginalized through the very act of romanticizing. Cianfanelli's slick, pared-down, iconographic recent works are intricately linked with the complexity of loving South Africa.

One of Cianfanelli's most recognisable works is the depiction of Nelson Mandela's head that is located at the site of Mandela's capture in Howick, South Africa.

Career

Education
In 1992, Cianfanelli received his BA/FA (painting) from the University of the Witwatersrand.

Exhibitions
 2012 University of Johannesburg, Johannesburg, South Africa
 2011 SA’ s first Annual International Land Art Event/ Plettenberg Bay
 2009 Absent Fields, Goodman Gallery, Johannesburg, South Africa
 2009 Contemporary sculpture in the landscape / Nirox Foundation; Johannesburg
 2008 Intervention, UNISA Art Gallery, Tswane
 2008 Production Marks, Grahamstown Festival, KZNSA Gallery, The Goethe Institute
 2008 Heptad, The Art Space, Johannesburg
 2007 Spier Contemporary, Stellenbosch, Cape Town
 2007 Positive, Sun City
 2007 Aardklop 10, Potchefstroom
 2006 Projected Development: return to begin, Aardklop Festival artist, Potchefstroom
 2005 Projected Development, Gallery Momo, Johannesburg
 2004 Brett Kebble Art Awards, Cape Town
 2003 ABSA Gallery, Johannesburg
 2002 Once were Painters, KKNK, Oudtshoorn.
 2001 We Love our customers, Hungarian Embassy, New York
 2000 Tour-guides of the inner city – URBAN FUTURES Rembrandt van Rijn Gallery, Johannesburg
 2000 Hoerikwaggo, South African National Gallery, Cape Town
 2000 SASOL New Signatures Revisited, Klein Karoo National Arts Festival, Oudtshoorn
 2000 Emotions and Relations, Sandton civic Art Gallery, Johannesburg
 1999 Channel, Association for Visual Arts, Cape Town
 2002 Joint exhibition with Stephanus Rademeyer, The Art Space, Johannesburg
 1998 Atlantis, Mark Coetzee Fine Art Cabinet, Cape Town
 1998 ! Xoe – Site Specific, Nieu-Bethesda, Eastern Cape
 1997 Taking Stock, Co-curated and exhibited, Johannesburg Stock Exchange, Johannesburg
 1997 Cyst: Works in Paint, Good Hope Gallery, The Castle, Cape Town
 1997 No. 4, Hillbrow Fort, Johannesburg
 1996 Record, Art Space, Newtown Cultural Precinct, Johannesburg

Collections
 SASOL
 ABSA
 DIADATA 
 Bloemfontein Art Museum

References

South African artists
1970 births
Living people